The American Research Center in Egypt (ARCE) is a scholarly institution dedicated to supporting the conservation of Egyptian antiquities and research in all periods of Egyptian history. The center is a member of the Council of American Overseas Research Centers (CAORC). Previous and current 990 forms that detail the organization's financial holdings and the compensation of its Executive Director and other key personnel are available to the public.

History
ARCE was founded in 1948 in Boston by Edward W. Forbes, then the director of the Fogg Museum at Harvard, and Sterling Dow, then president of the Archaeological Institute of America, with the intention of creating a research center in Egypt on the model of similar institutions in Greece and Rome. The center's Egyptian headquarters opened in 1951 in an office at the Office of U.S. Information and Educational Exchange in the American Embassy in Cairo. Throughout its early years, the center received substantial funding from the United States Department of State. In the aftermath of the devastating earthquake in 1992, ARCE was chosen by USAID to administer an American-funded initiative to restore damage done to Egypt's tangible cultural heritage. This work resulted in the completion of more than fifty conservation projects throughout Egypt.

Present activities

ARCE's headquarters are in the Garden City neighborhood of Cairo, with a subsidiary office in Luxor. The United States headquarters are in Alexandria, Virginia. The Cairo Center features a specialist research library and conference facilities and is intended as a base for academics from the United States and elsewhere when conducting research in Egypt. ARCE also awards fellowships for research in Egypt.

Affiliate institutions
 American University in Cairo
 Ancient Egypt Research Associates
 The Ancient Egyptian Heritage and Archaeology Fund
 Ashmolean Museum of Art and Archaeology, Oxford University
 Brigham Young University
 The British Museum
 The Brooklyn Museum
 Brown University
 Council of American Overseas Research Centers
 Cultural Association for the Study of Egypt and Sudan
DePaul University
 The Getty Conservation Institute
 Harvard University
 The Institute of Fine Arts, New York University
 Los Angeles County Museum of Art
 The Metropolitan Museum of Art
 Michael C. Carlos Museum, Emory University
 The Oriental Institute of the University of Chicago
 Pacific Lutheran University
 Princeton University
 Roanoke College
 University of Arizona
 University of Arkansas
 University of California, Los Angeles
 University of California, Santa Cruz
 University of Memphis
 University of Michigan
 The University of Notre Dame
 University of Pennsylvania Museum of Archaeology and Anthropology
 York University, Faculty of the Arts

References

External links 
Official website
ARCE Digital Collections hosted by the UCLA Digital Library 

Council of American Overseas Research Centers
Middle Eastern studies in the United States
Egyptology